"Give It to Ya" is the title of a R&B single by Chantay Savage. It was the final single from her album Here We Go...

Music video
A music video was directed by Jeffery Byrd in 1994 in Los Angeles.

Chart positions

References

1994 singles
Chantay Savage songs
1993 songs
Songs written by Eric Miller (musician)
RCA Records singles
Songs written by Chantay Savage
Songs written by M-Doc